Stromatella may refer to:

 Stromatella (lichen) , a genus of lichens in the family Lichinaceae
 Stromatella (alga) , a genus of algae in the family Chaetophoraceae